The 1900 Blackpool by-election was held on 21 December 1900 after the incumbent Conservative MP Sir Matthew Ridley was appointed Crown Stewart and Bailiff of the Chiltern Hundreds on 11 December 1900, ahead of being elevated to the peerage as Viscount Ridley on 17 December 1900. Ridley had been Home Secretary from 1895 to 12 November 1900.

The seat was retained by the Conservative candidate Henry Worsley-Taylor.

References 

By-elections to the Parliament of the United Kingdom in Lancashire constituencies
1900 elections in the United Kingdom
1900 in England
December 1900 events
1900s in Lancashire